This is a list of candidates for the longest English word of one syllable, i.e. monosyllables with the most letters. A list of 9,123 English monosyllables published in 1957 includes three ten-letter words: scraunched, scroonched, and squirreled.  Guinness World Records lists scraunched and strengthed. Other sources include words as long or longer. Some candidates are questionable on grounds of spelling, pronunciation, or status as obsolete, nonstandard, proper noun, loanword, or nonce word. Thus, the definition of longest English word with one syllable is somewhat subjective, and there is no single unambiguously correct answer.

List

Proper names

Some nine-letter proper names remain monosyllabic when adding a tenth letter and apostrophe to form the possessive: 
 Laugharne's  
 Scoughall's  

Note that both use the ough tetragraph, which can represent a wide variety of sounds in English.

In his short story, "Strychnine in the Soup", P. G. Wodehouse had a character whose surname was "Mapledurham", pronounced "Mum". This is eleven letters, while "Mapledurham's" is twelve.

It is productive in English to convert a (proper) noun into an eponymous verb or adjective:
 A 2007–08 promotion in France used the slogan "Do you Schweppes?", implying a past tense Schweppesed (11 letters) for the putative verb.
 Schwartzed (10 letters) has been used to mean "(re)designed in the style of Martha Schwartz"
 Schwartzed has also been used to mean "crossed swords with Justice Alan R. Schwartz"
 Schmertzed (10 letters) has been used to mean "received undue largesse from New York City through the intervention of negotiator Eric Schmertz"

Contrived endings
In a 1970 article in Word Ways, Ralph G. Beaman converts past participles ending -ed into nouns, allowing regular plurals with -s. He lists five verbs in Webster's Third International generating 10-letter monosyllables scratcheds, screecheds, scroungeds, squelcheds, stretcheds; from the verb strength in Webster's Second International he forms the 11-letter strengtheds.

The past tense ending -ed and the archaic second person singular ending -st can be combined into -edst; for example "In the day when I cried thou answeredst me, and strengthenedst me with strength in my soul". While this ending is usually pronounced as a separate syllable from the verb stem, it may be abbreviated -'dst to indicate elision. Attested examples include scratch'dst and stretch'dst, each of which has one syllable spelled with ten letters plus apostrophe.

See also 
 Longest word in English

References

External links 
 askoxford.com: What is the longest one-syllable English word?
 rec-puzzles.org: What words have an exceptional number of letters per syllable?

One Syllable
English orthography
English phonology
English words
Phonotactics